Hilderstone is a civil parish in the Borough of Stafford, Staffordshire, England.  It contains 15 listed buildings that are recorded in the National Heritage List for England. All the listed buildings are designated at Grade II, the lowest of the three grades, which is applied to "buildings of national importance and special interest".  The parish includes the village of Hilderstone and the surrounding countryside.  Most of the listed buildings are houses, cottages and farmhouses, the others being a church and associated structures, and a telephone kiosk.


Buildings

References

Citations

Sources

Lists of listed buildings in Staffordshire